Nam Chiao is a tambon (sub-district) of Laem Ngop District, Trat Province, eastern Thailand.

Geography
The area features foothills, plains and mangrove forests. 

Neighboring tambons are (from the north clockwise): Khlong Yai, Nong Sano, Laem Ngop, Khlong Yai.

It is about 9 km (5.5 mi) from Mueang Trat District.

History
Nam Chiao consists of four mubans (villages).The main village is Ban Nam Chiao, a more than 200-year-old community.

Originally, Nam Chiao people were Thai Buddhists. Later, Chinese came to trade by junk and settled there. In the reign of King Rama III, Cham Muslims fled the French suppression from Cambodia to settle there. Nam Chiao then comprised three races and three religions.

Culture 
The three houses of worship are Wat (Thai temple), Church, and Masjid are evidence of the district.

Economy 
Nam Chiao developed an ecotourism site. The highlight is Saphan Wat Chai (สะพานวัดใจ), an arched bridge over the khlong that is the same height as the three-story building or the spar of a fishing boat. Locals call this bridge the Daredevil Bridge.

Etymology 

Its name Nam Chiao means "torrent", referring to a large khlong (canal) that runs through the district. During flooding season the water will flow rapidly that it cannot be sailed.

Administration

Central administration
Nam Chiao is subdivided into four administrative villages

Local administration
The area of the tambon is shared by local governments.
the thesaban tambon (subdistrict municipality) Nam Chiao (เทศบาลตำบลน้ำเชี่ยว)

Local products
Ngob (wide-brimmed straw hat)
Distilled liquor

References

External links 

http://www.namchieo.go.th Website of municipality

Tambon of Trat Province